Ametzaga or Ametzaga Zuia is a village and council located in the municipality of Zuia, in Álava province, Basque Country, Spain. As of 2020, it has a population of 266.

Geography 
Ametzaga is located 23km northwest of Vitoria-Gasteiz.

References

Populated places in Álava